Plumapathes pennacea is a species of black coral in the order Antipatharia. It is found in the tropical Indian, Pacific and Atlantic Oceans in deep reef habitats where it forms part of a biologically diverse community.

Description
Black corals are so called because the main axial skeleton is made of a spiny, keratin-like substance called "antipathin" which is a dark brownish-black. This colonial coral has a bushy, two dimensional form and grows out of a holdfast firmly anchored to a rock. The slender branches fork at intervals and divide pinnately, and the smallest pinnules are a few centimetres long and close together, forming a feather-like effect. The polyps are golden brown, brown or blackish, the ones on the pinnules being paler in colour; they may make the axis appear dark red. The size and shape of the polyps vary across the colony, with the polyps most distant from the holdfast being more elongate than the others. Each polyp has six, non-retractile, unbranched tentacles.

Distribution and habitat
It is present in the Caribbean Sea, the Bahamas and southern Florida, but not in Bermuda.

Ecology
A number of other organisms live on this coral or are associated with it. Algae, hydroids and bryozoans settle and grow on the branches, and several species of shrimps, stalked barnacles, molluscs and fish are associated with it, many as symbionts with some hiding among the branches, and others feeding on the polyps. The living tissue of the coral may grow over the surface of the black coral barnacle (Oxynaspis gracilis). Growth rates of black corals are low and this coral lives for thirty or more years.

References

Myriopathidae
Cnidarians of the Atlantic Ocean
Cnidarians of the Indian Ocean
Cnidarians of the Pacific Ocean
Cnidarians of the Caribbean Sea
Marine fauna of Asia
Marine fauna of Oceania
Marine fauna of North America
Anthozoa of the United States
Corals described in 1766
Taxa named by Peter Simon Pallas